Kelmscott and Langford railway station was a railway station south of the village of Langford on the Oxford, Witney and Fairford Railway, between  and .

History
The station was opened on 4 November 1907 by the Great Western Railway, the only one to be opened on the line during peacetime by the Great Western. It was shown in early timetables as "Kelmscott and Langford Platform", which also appeared in the Official Handbook of Stations until 1949. It was supposed to serve the villages of Langford and Kelmscott but in reality was a considerable distance from both. Langford is 0.5 mi to the north, and Kelmscott is 1.5 mi to the south.

It was essentially a staffed railway halt with minimal passenger facilities. This was probably the longest building of its type in the country. A single siding operated from the nearby ground frame was brought into use behind the platform for the purpose of loading and unloading cattle traffic and farm machinery on 9 July 1928. No signals, goods shed or crane were provided and the small goods yard was only able to handle cattle and coal class traffic in full wagonloads.

Perhaps owing to its inconvenient location, the station was the least used on the line. Just 3,038 tickets were issued in 1913 and 3,654 in 1923, by some distance the lowest. The station was closed along with the East Gloucestershire Railway on 18 June 1962.

Present day
Although traces of the station's platform, lampposts and nameboard posts remained in September 1987, the site has now been entirely cleared by the local farmer except for a pole which once held the station's lighting. Large stretches of the trackbed towards  do however remain intact. The station's access road remains in use by the farmer.

References

Notes

Sources

External links
 Photos and details about the station
 Station on 1947 OS Map
Archived page with post-closure details of stations

Former Great Western Railway stations
Disused railway stations in Oxfordshire
Railway stations in Great Britain opened in 1907
Railway stations in Great Britain closed in 1962
West Oxfordshire District